Serampore Girl's High School also called Akna Girl's High School is a girls school. It is located in Serampore City Mahesh Battala area in the Indian state of West Bengal (Hooghly District). It is s affiliated to West Bengal Board of Secondary Education.

Curriculum 
Students choose Madhyamik curriculum until grade (class) 10 and Uchcha Madhyamik curriculum from grade (class) 11 to grade (class) 12. However, they may choose to study either Science (Physics, Chemistry, Maths and Biology), Commerce (Accountancy, Business studies, Casting and taxation, Commercial law & preliminaries of auditing).

School session 
The school session is from January to December. The school timings : 10:35 am to 4:30 pm (Mon - Fri) & 10:35 am to 1:40 pm (Sat). Sunday is the normal weekly holiday.

References 

Girls' schools in West Bengal
High schools and secondary schools in West Bengal
Schools in Hooghly district
Serampore
Educational institutions established in 1879
1879 establishments in India